Asher is an English and Germanic
occupational surname for an ash maker, derived from the Midd English surname "Aschere" or from German " Äscher"(Ashman). It could also be a form of the Old English surname "Æsċer"(Æsċe +ere), meaning someone who lived by an ash tree or ash grove, suffix denoting an inhabitant. It is also a common Jewish and Christian first name, as well as a Jewish surname, and is the name of Asher the son of Israel in the Hebrew Bible—therefore  unrelated to the Old English or Germanic occupational root.
Jacob said that the land of Asher would have rich food and delicacies fit for kings. Moses also gave a blessing to each of the twelve tribes. Moses' blessing said that Asher would be blessed with sons, pleasing to his brothers, and have his foot immersed in oil.

People with the surname
 Alec Asher (born 1991), baseball player
 Alexander Asher (1835–1905), Scottish politician
 Allan Asher (born 1951), Australian public affairs official and activist
 Barry Asher (born 1946), American bowler
 Bud Asher (1925–2013), American politician, football coach and lawyer
 Gerald Asher (born 1932), wine writer, ex-wine merchant
 Hank Asher (–2013), businessman
 Helen Asher (1927–), German-born Australian novelist and short story writer
 Herb Asher (born 1944), university professor
 Iraena Asher (1979–disappeared 2004), New Zealand trainee teacher and model, disappeared
 Irving Asher (1903–1985), motion picture producer
 Jack Asher (1916–1991), British cinematographer
 Jana Asher, American statistician and human rights activist
 Jane Asher (1946), English actress and novelist
 Jane Asher (swimmer) (1931), British swimmer
 Japhet Asher (1961), English filmmaker
 Jeremy Asher (1958), English businessman
 John Mallory Asher (1971), American actor and director
 Joseph Mayor Asher (1872–1909), English-American rabbi and professor
 Lee Asher (1976), magician
 Levi Asher, New York, U.S.-based writer and web designer
 Max Asher, drummer of the band Warrant
 Maxine Asher (1930–2015), researcher and businesswoman
 Michael Asher (artist) (1943–2012), an American conceptual artist
 Michael Asher (explorer) (1953), a British explorer and author
 Neal Asher (1961), English science fiction writer
 Peter Asher (1944), artist and record producer
 Richard Asher (1912–1969), British endocrinologist and hematologist
 Robert Asher (director) (1915–1979), a British film and television director
 Roderick Asher (1931–1997), American geologist
 Tommy Asher (1936–2017), English footballer
 Tony Asher (1939), American lyricist
 William Asher (1921–2012), American producer, director and writer
 Zev Asher (1963–2013), Canadian musician and film director

People with the given name
 Asher, character in the Hebrew Bible
 Asher Angel (2002), American child actor
 Asher Allen (1988), University of Georgia cornerback
 Ralph Asher Alpher (1921–2007), American cosmologist
 Asher Asher (1837–1889), Scottish physician
 Asher ben Jehiel (1250 or 1259–1328), rabbi and Talmudist
 Asher Benjamin  (1773–1845), American architect
 Asher Blinkoff (2008), American child actor
 Asher Book (1988), American actor
 Asher Brown Durand (1796–1886), American painter
 Asher Cohen, psychologist and President of the Hebrew University of Jerusalem 
 Asher D (disambiguation)
Asher Goodson (2014), video game designer
 Asher Hirsch Ginsberg (1856–1927), pseudonym Ahad Ha'am, essayist
 Asher Hong (2004), American artistic gymnast
 Asher Hucklesby (1844–1908), mayor of Luton, Bedfordshire, UK and hat manufacturer
 Asher Karni (1954), businessman known for involvement of Pakistani and Israeli nuclear programs
 Asher Keddie (1974), Australian actress
 Asher Lämmlein, German who proclaimed himself a forerunner of the Jewish Messiah in 1502
 Simon A. (Asher) Levin (1941), American ecologist
 Asher Levy (d. 1682), butcher who left Recife, Brazil for New Amsterdam, U.S. in 1654
 Arthur (Asher) Miller (1915–2005), American playwright and essayist
 Judd Asher Nelson (1959), American actor
 Asher Peres (1934–2005), Israeli physicist
 Asher Robbins (1757–1845), United States Senator
 Asher Roth, American rapper, (1985)
 Neil Asher Silberman (1950), American archaeologist and historian
 Asher Tishler (born 1947), Israeli economist; president of the College of Management Academic Studies 
 Shallum Asher Xavier (1978), guitarist of the band Fuzön

Fictional characters named Asher
 Asher, one of Jonas' best friends in The Giver

See also
Ascher, an alternative spelling of Asher
Asha (disambiguation)
Ben Asher (surname)

References

English masculine given names
English-language surnames
Surnames of Old English origin
Jewish given names
Hebrew-language given names